Scandium perchlorate is an inorganic compound with the chemical formula Sc(ClO4)3.

Production 
Scandium perchlorate can be prepared by dissolving scandium oxide in perchloric acid:

References 

Scandium compounds
Perchlorates